Eileen Anne Badham (born 2 November 1951) is a New Zealand former cricketer who played as an all-rounder, batting right-handed and bowling left-arm medium. She appeared in 3 Test matches and 13 One Day Internationals for New Zealand between 1976 and 1982. She also appearead in 6 matches for International XI at the 1973 World Cup. She played domestic cricket for North Shore.

References

External links

1951 births
Living people
People from Mangakino
New Zealand women cricketers
New Zealand women Test cricketers
New Zealand women One Day International cricketers
International XI women One Day International cricketers
North Shore women cricketers
Cricketers from Waikato